Boryslav Mykolayovych  Brondukov (1 March 1938 – 10 March 2004) was a Ukrainian film character actor, People's Artist of Ukraine.

He was born in the village of Dubova in Poliske Raion of Kiev oblast,  Ukrainian SSR in a Russian-Polish family. After graduating a construction vocational school he started to work at the Kiev Arsenal factory which after World War II was once again established in the city.

At this time Brondukov began to perform in theater as well. His work was seen by the rector of Karpenko-Karyi Institute of Theatrical Arts in Kiev and at an age of 23 Borislav became a student there.

Since 1965 Brondukov has been an actor of the Dovzhenko Film Studios (Kiev), though he has worked at many other film studios in the Soviet Union as well.

Brondukov became a People's Artist of the Ukrainian SSR (1988) and the first winner of the Alexander Dovzhenko Ukrainian State Prize (1995).

He was featured in over 100 movies among which are Zakhar Berkut, Vavilon, Mimino,  the Sherlock Holmes and Dr. Watson TV series (as  Inspector Lestrade), and others.

Selected filmography
 Flower on the Stone (1962) as Kovalyov
 Viy (Вий, 1967) as divinity student (uncredited)
 Annychka (Аннычка, 1968) as Krupyak
 The Stone Cross (Камінний хрест, 1968)
 Dangerous Tour  (Опасные гастроли, 1969) as Antip, the watchman
 Olesya  (Олеся, 1971) as Yarmola
 Bonus (Премия, 1975) as Aleksandr Zyubin
 Gypsies Are Found Near Heaven (Табор уходит в небо, 1975) as Bucha
 Afonya (Афоня, 1975) as Fedulov
 The Captivating Star of Happiness (Звезда пленительного счастья, 1975) as soldier
 The Days of the Turbins (Дни Турбиных, 1976) as bolshevik agitator
 The Troubled Month of Veresen (Тревожный месяц вересень, 1977) as Popelenko
 Mimino (Мимино, 1977) as helicopter passenger
 The Nose (Нос, 1977) as Ivan
 Autumn Marathon (Осенний марафон, 1979) as casual passer
 Sherlock Holmes and Dr. Watson (Приключения Шерлока Холмса и доктора Ватсона. Знакомство, 1979) as Inspector Lestrade
 The Garage (Гараж, 1981) as The Groom
 The Adventures of Sherlock Holmes and Dr. Watson (Приключения Шерлока Холмса и доктора Ватсона. Смертельная схватка, 1980) as Inspector Lestrade
 The Hound of the Baskervilles (Приключения Шерлока Холмса и доктора Ватсона. Собака Баскервилей, 1981) as Inspector Lestrade
 Say a Word for the Poor Hussar (О бедном гусаре замолвите слово, 1981) as 2nd jailer
 Tears Were Falling (Слёзы капали, 1982) as Fyodor
 Sportloto-82 (Спортлото-82, 1982) as director of the tourist camp
 The Treasures of Agra (Приключения Шерлока Холмса и доктора Ватсона. Сокровища Агры, 1983) as Inspector Lestrade
 We Are from Jazz (Мы из джаза, 1983) as fake of Captain Kolbasyev
 If to Believe Lopotukhin... (Если верить Лопотухину, 1983) as Uncle Kolya
 A Cruel Romance (Жестокий романс, 1984) as servant
 Dangerous for Your Life! (Опасно для жизни, 1985) as Andrey Pavlovich Peredelkin
 The Twentieth Century Approaches (Приключения Шерлока Холмса и доктора Ватсона. Двадцатый век начинается, 1986) as Inspector Lestrade
 A Man from the Boulevard des Capucines (Человек с бульвара Капуцинов, 1987) as stray cowboy
 Bright Personality (Светлая личность, 1988) as head of personnel
 The Master and Margarita (Мастер и Маргарита, 1994) as Ivan Savilievich Varenukha

References

External links

Ukrainian male film actors
Ukrainian people of Polish descent
Soviet male film actors
1938 births
2004 deaths
People from Kyiv Oblast
Kyiv National I. K. Karpenko-Kary Theatre, Cinema and Television University alumni
Burials at Baikove Cemetery
Ukrainian people of Russian descent
Laureates of the Oleksandr Dovzhenko State Prize